Fleming College is a college in Peterborough, Ontario, Canada.

Fleming College may also refer to:

 Sir Alexander Fleming College in Trujillo, Perú
 Fleming College Florence, founded in Switzerland in 1968, relocated to Florence, Italy in 1972